Beth Morgan Cunningham (born Beth Morgan on June 5, 1975 in Greenville, Ohio) is currently the head coach of the Missouri State women's basketball team.

Career
She was previously an associate head coach at Duke and Notre Dame and had been the women's basketball head coach at Virginia Commonwealth University and a former women's basketball player.

As Beth Morgan, she played for the University of Notre Dame, the Richmond Rage/Philadelphia Rage of the American Basketball League and the Washington Mystics of the WNBA before turning to coaching. She finished her playing career as one of the most decorated and top womens basketball players of all time.

She also played on the American teams in 1997 World University Games
 and the 1999 Pan-American Games.

Cunningham ranked as #1 on Notre Dame's all-time scoring list with 2,322 points, until surpassed by Skylar Diggins. Diggins had played 17 more games than Cunningham did at Notre Dame. During her career, she set or tied 28 school records. In her final two seasons, she was a first team all-Big-East selection.

Cunningham took over the VCU Rams for the 2003–2004 season after serving as assistant coach of the team for two years.During her playing days at Notre Dame (1993-97), Beth (Morgan) Cunningham was a trailblazer, leading the program to its first NCAA Women’s Final Four appearance and a 31-7 campaign her senior season. She was a two-time Associated Press and WBCA honorable mention All-America choice, four-time first-team all-conference selection and two-year team captain. The Irish were 97-32 in her four seasons, including a pair of conference titles and three NCAA appearances. She departed as the all-time leading scorer in Fighting Irish women’s basketball history with 2,322 points (which now ranks third), having set or tied 28 school records during her career.
 
She was also a fixture in USA Basketball circles as both a player and coach, first suiting up for Team USA four times from 1996-99 (winning three medals including a gold at the 1997 USA World University Games) and later serving as the athlete representative on the USA Basketball Women’s Junior National Team Committee and the USA Basketball Women’s Collegiate Committee.
 
Following her amateur career, Cunningham spent three seasons playing professional basketball, including two years with the Richmond/Philadelphia Rage of the American Basketball League (ABL) and one year with the WNBA’s Washington Mystics in 2000 before embarking on her coaching career.
 
Her father, Bob Morgan, was the head baseball coach at Indiana University for 22 years before retiring in 2005.

Personal life
She married Dan Cunningham in 1998. Originally from Bloomington, Ind., Cunningham was a standout two-sport performer at Bloomington South High School, earning all-state honors in both basketball and tennis. She was inducted into the Monroe County Sports Hall of Fame in June 2011. She graduated from Notre Dame in 1997 with a bachelor’s degree in Marketing from the top-ranked Mendoza College of Business before going on to earn her Master’s degree in Sports Leadership from VCU in 2003.
 
Cunningham and her husband, Dan, are the proud parents of three daughters (Margaret, Carly and Gretchen) and one son (Danny).
 .

Notre Dame statistics
Source

Head Coaching Record

Notes

External links
Notre Dame magazine article featuring Morgan
VCU Biography

1975 births
Living people
American women's basketball coaches
American women's basketball players
Basketball coaches from Indiana
Basketball coaches from Ohio
Basketball players at the 1999 Pan American Games
Basketball players from Indiana
Basketball players from Ohio
Duke Blue Devils women's basketball coaches
Notre Dame Fighting Irish women's basketball coaches
Notre Dame Fighting Irish women's basketball players
Pan American Games bronze medalists for the United States
Pan American Games medalists in basketball
Parade High School All-Americans (girls' basketball)
Philadelphia Rage players
Shooting guards
Sportspeople from Bloomington, Indiana
Universiade gold medalists for the United States
Universiade medalists in basketball
VCU Rams women's basketball coaches
Washington Mystics players
Medalists at the 1997 Summer Universiade
Medalists at the 1999 Pan American Games
Missouri State Lady Bears basketball coaches